The United Arab Emirates Navy is the naval branch of the United Arab Emirates Armed Forces. It is small force of about 3,000 personnel. It maintains 12 well-equipped coastal patrol boats and eight missile boats.
Although primarily concerned with coastal defense, the Navy is constructing a six-unit class of blue water corvettes in conjunction with French shipbuilder CMN.
The UAE maintains a small battalion-sized marine force called the UAE Marines equipped with BMP-3 armoured personnel carriers.

Swedish shipbuilder Swede Ship Marine have built four 24 m Amphibious Troop Transport Vessel and one 25 m Fast Supply Vessel for the UAE Navy (delivered between 2003 and 2005). Three additional vessels are being built by Swede Ship Marine for the UAE Navy (see Future Navy).

History 
The origins of the UAE Navy begin with the Abu Dhabi Defence Force (ADDF) which established a Sea Wing in 1967. The initial fleet gave Abu Dhabi a limited brown-water patrolling and protecting capability in the waters of the Persian Gulf and in the littoral region of the Northern Emirates in the Gulf of Oman. This included protection of the UAE's significant offshore oil and gas facilities.

With the formation of the United Arab Emirates on 2 December 1971 and the unification of the UAE Armed Forces on 6 May 1976, the ADDF Sea Wing became the UAE Navy and continued to expand with naval facilities at Abu Dhabi port in 1975 as well as other facilities at the far west of Abu Dhabi Emirate and on the eastern coast of Fujairah at Khor Fakkan.

The Iran-Iraq War (1980-1988) and especially the 1986 'tanker war' in the Persian Gulf culminated in the 25 November 1986 attack of Abu Dhabi's Abu Al Bukhoosh offshore oil platforms by Iranian aircraft. These incidents led to further expansion of the UAE's Navy assets in this period.

The 1990s and 2000s saw further consolidation. In 2001, the UAE Coast Guard, which had been under the control of the UAE Ministry of Interior since 1976, was transferred to the control of the Navy. This change was likely in response to increased concern over the possibility of terrorist attacks on critical infrastructure in the UAE's littoral zone and on its islands in the post-9/11 world, and the effectiveness of the Coast Guard in countering this threat. Another change in the Navy's force structure in the 2000's was the expansion of its amphibious capability and the formation of the UAE Navy Marines (subsequently merged with the UAE Presidential Guard).

Since 2015, the UAE Navy has been operating in the Yemen region in response to the Civil War there.

Equipment

Vessels

Leased
 HSV-2 Swift - Sub-leased or transferred from the UAE's National Marine Dredging Company sometime early in 2015. Used for logistics and related activities as part of the ongoing Saudi Arabian-led intervention in Yemen, including reportedly in support of amphibious operations. This ship was directly hit by a Houthi missile attack and severely damaged during operations in October 2016.

Future Navy
Till 2014 will be commissioned 12 Ghannatha Phase II class fast missile landing crafts. First unit was be launched in July 2012. Other 12 will be upgraded from Ghannatha Phase I class

4 Falaj 2 class patrol vessel (based on the Italian Diciotti class) on order, 2 being fitted out - 550 tons - 4 MM-40 Exocets - 6 Mica VL SAM (2 more to be produced with 2 more in the future, grand total 8)

One 26 m Offshore Patrol Vessel, one 24 m Amphibious Troop Transport Vessel and one 24 m Patrol Vessel is under construction for the UAE Navy.

See also
 UAE Armed Forces

Further reading 
The Evolution of the Armed Forces of the United Arab Emirates by Athol Yates
The Military and Police Forces of the Gulf States - Volume 1: Trucial States and United Arab Emirates, 1951-1980 by Athol Yates & Cliff Lord
The Naval Forces of Abu Dhabi 1967-1976 by Athol Yates & Cliff Lord

References